The Havel–Hakimi algorithm is an algorithm in graph theory solving the graph realization problem. That is, it answers the following question: Given a finite list of nonnegative integers in non-increasing order, is there a simple graph such that its degree sequence is exactly this list? A simple graph contains no double edges or loops. The degree sequence is a list of numbers in nonincreasing order indicating the number of edges incident to each vertex in the graph. If a simple graph exists for exactly the given degree sequence, the list of integers is called graphic. The Havel-Hakimi algorithm constructs a special solution if a simple graph for the given degree sequence exists, or proves that one cannot find a positive answer. This construction is based on a recursive algorithm.

The algorithm
The Havel-Hakimi algorithm is based on the following theorem.

Let  be a finite list of nonnegative integers that is nonincreasing. Let  be a second finite list of nonnegative integers that is rearranged to be nonincreasing. List  is graphic if and only if list  is graphic.

If the given list  is graphic, then the theorem will be applied at most  times setting in each further step . Note that it can be necessary to sort this list again. This process ends when the whole list  consists of zeros. Let  be a simple graph with the degree sequence : Let the vertex  have degree ; let the vertices  have respective degrees ; let the vertices  have respective degrees . When the list  cannot be reduced to a list  of nonnegative integers in any step of this approach, the theorem proves that the list  from the beginning is not graphic.

Proof 
The following is a summary based on the proof of the Havel-Hakimi algorithm in Invitation to Combinatorics (Shahriari 2022).

To prove the Havel-Hakimi algorithm always works, assume that  is graphic, and there exists a simple graph  with the degree sequence . Then we add a new vertex  adjacent to the  vertices with degrees  to obtain the degree sequence . 

To prove the other direction, assume that  is graphic, and there exists a simple graph  with the degree sequence  and vertices .

In this case, we remove  with all its incident edges to obtain the degree sequence .

Then we can change the graph  so that  is adjacent to  while maintaining the same degree sequence . We know , as the degree sequence  is in non-increasing order.

Thus any vertex not connected to  can be connected to  using the above method, and then we have the first case once more, through which we can obtain the degree sequence . Hence,  is graphic if and only if  is also graphic.

Examples 
Let  be a nonincreasing, finite degree sequence of nonnegative integers. To test whether this degree sequence is graphic, we apply the Havel-Hakimi algorithm:

First, we remove the vertex with the highest degree — in this case,  —  and all its incident edges to get  (assuming the vertex with highest degree is adjacent to the  vertices with next highest degree). We rearrange this sequence in nonincreasing order to get . We repeat the process, removing the vertex with the next highest degree to get  and rearranging to get . We continue this removal to get , and then . This sequence is clearly graphic, as it is the simple graph of  isolated vertices.

To show an example of a non-graphic sequence, let  be a nonincreasing, finite degree sequence of nonnegative integers. Applying the algorithm, we first remove the degree  vertex and all its incident edges to get . This means that two of the vertices are connected to all the other vertices with the exception of the isolated one, so the minimum degree of each vertex should be ; however, the sequence claims to have a vertex with degree . Thus, the sequence is not graphic.

For the sake of the algorithm, if we were to reiterate the process, we would get  which is yet more clearly not graphic. Thus the sequence cannot be graphic.

See also
Erdős–Gallai theorem

Notes

References

.

West, Douglas B. (2001). Introduction to graph theory. Second Edition. Prentice Hall, 2001. 45-46.

Graph algorithms